Cumulus Networks was a computer software company headquartered in Mountain View, California, USA. The company designed and sold a Linux operating system for industry standard network switches, along with management software, for large datacenter, cloud computing, and enterprise environments.

In May 2020, American semiconductor manufacturer Nvidia announced it was acquiring Cumulus. Post acquisition the company was absorbed into Nvidia's networking business unit, along with Mellanox. Nvidia still offers Cumulus Linux.

Background
Cumulus Networks was founded by JR Rivers and Nolan Leake in 2010. The company raised a first round of seed funding in 2012. Cumulus Networks emerged publicly in June 2013 after previously operating in stealth mode. The company is backed by Andreessen Horowitz, Battery Ventures, Sequoia Capital, Peter Wagner and 4 of the 5 original VMware founders.

In 2014 Dell began offering the option of the Cumulus Linux network OS on Dell's switches.

In 2015, Hewlett Packard Enterprise (HPE) began offering the option of Cumulus Linux on HPE's switches.

In 2016, Mellanox began offering Cumulus Linux on their Spectrum switches.

In 2018, Lenovo began offering Cumulus Linux on their ThinkSystem Rackswitch line of switches.

On June 20, 2019, the company announced the departure of co-founder JR Rivers, who had been the original CEO and, since March 2016, the CTO.  According to the company's website, neither Rivers nor Leake remain on the Board of Directors.

In January 2020, Hewlett Packard announced a partnership with Cumulus to include Cumulus' Linux NetQ software on HPE's network storage products. On May 4, Nvidia Corporation announced plans to acquire Cumulus Networks for an undisclosed amount.

Products

Cumulus Linux 
Cumulus Linux was their open Linux based networking operating system for bare metal switches. It's been based on the Debian Linux distribution.

In a 2017 Gartner report Cumulus Networks was highlighted as a pioneer of open source networking for developing an open source networking operating system in a market where hardware vendors usually delivered proprietary operating systems pre-installed. According to Gartner, Cumulus Networks had worked around the lack of vendor support for open source networking by deploying bare metal switches with the Cumulus Linux operating system in large corporate networks. 32 percent of the Fortune 50 companies used the Cumulus Linux operating system in their data centers in 2017.

NetQ 
NetQ is network state validation software, used during regular operations and for post-mortem diagnostic analysis.

Host Pack 
Host Pack includes software that brings the host to the network through NetQ and FRRouting. Host Pack improves network visibility through NetQ’s end-to-end fabric validation, and helps network connectivity through FRRouting’s open source routing protocol. It enables the host to be part of the layer 3 network, while supporting layer 2 overlay networks.

Open source projects

Open Network Install Environment (ONIE) 
In 2012 Cumulus initiated the open network install environment (ONIE) project. The Open Compute Project turned ONIE into an initiative to define an open source install environment for bare metal network switches. A network switch with a ONIE install environment gives data centers the choice of network operating system, disaggregating the networking hardware from the operating system. The Cumulus Linux operating system can be installed on all ONIE compliant switches.

References

2010 establishments in California
Companies based in Mountain View, California
American companies established in 2010
Networking companies of the United States
Networking software companies
Nvidia
2020 mergers and acquisitions